Rashid Ismail Khalidi (born 1948) is an American historian of the Middle East and the Edward Said Professor of Modern Arab Studies at Columbia University. He served as editor of the Journal of Palestine Studies from 2002 until 2020, when he became co-editor with Sherene Seikaly. 

He has also authored a number of books including The Hundred Years' War on Palestine and Palestinian Identity: The Construction of Modern National Consciousness, served as president of the Middle East Studies Association, and taught at the Lebanese University, the American University of Beirut, Georgetown University, and the University of Chicago.

Family, education and career
Khalidi was born in New York City. Khalidi is the son of Ismail Khalidi and the nephew of Husayin al-Khalidi. He is the father of playwright Ismail Khalidi and activist/attorney, Dima Khalidi.  He grew up in New York City, where his father, a Saudi citizen of Palestinian origin who was born in Jerusalem, worked for the United Nations. Khalidi's mother, a Lebanese-American, was an interior decorator. Khalidi attended the United Nations International School.

In 1970, Khalidi received a B.A. from Yale University, where he was a member of the Wolf's Head Society. He then received a D.Phil. from Oxford University in 1974. Between 1976 and 1983, Khalidi "was teaching full time as an Assistant Professor in the Political Studies and Public Administration Dept. at the American University of Beirut, published two books and several articles, and also was a research fellow at the independent Institute for Palestine Studies". He has also taught at the Lebanese University.

Khalidi became politically active in Beirut, where he resided through the 1982 Lebanon War. "I was deeply involved in politics in Beirut" in the 1970s, he said in an interview. Khalidi was cited in the media during this period, sometimes as an official with the Palestinian News Service, Wafa, or directly with the Palestinian Liberation Organization. However, Khalidi has denied that he was a PLO spokesman, stating that he "often spoke to journalists in Beirut, who usually cited me without attribution as a well-informed Palestinian source. If some misidentified me at the time, I am not aware of it." Subsequently, sources disagreed as to the nature or existence of Khalidi's official relationship with the organization.

Returning to America, Khalidi spent two years teaching at Columbia University before joining the faculty of the University of Chicago in 1987, where he spent eight years as a professor and director of both the Center for Middle Eastern Studies and the Center for International Studies at the University of Chicago. During the Gulf War, while teaching at Chicago, Khalidi emerged "as one of the most influential commentators from within Middle Eastern Studies". In 2003 he joined the faculty of Columbia University, where he currently serves as the Edward Said Professor of Modern Arab Studies. He has also taught at Georgetown University.

Khalidi is married to Mona Khalidi, who served as assistant dean of student affairs and the assistant director of graduate studies of the School of International and Public Affairs at Columbia University. He is a member of the National Advisory Committee of the U.S. Interreligious Committee for Peace in the Middle East, which describes itself as "a national organization of Jews, Christians and Muslims dedicated to dialogue, education and advocacy for peace based on the deepest teachings of the three religious traditions".

He is member of the Board of Sponsors of The Palestine–Israel Journal, a publication founded by Ziad Abuzayyad and Victor Cygielman, prominent Palestinian and Israeli journalists. He is founding trustee of The Center for Palestine Research and Studies. He is also a member of the Council on Foreign Relations.

In October 2010, Khalidi delivered the annual Edward Said memorial lecture at the Palestine Center in Washington.

Academic work
Khalidi's research covers primarily the history of the modern Middle East. He focuses on the countries of the southern and eastern Mediterranean, with an eye to the emergence of various national identities and the role played by external powers in their development. He also researches the impact of the press on forming new senses of community, the role of education in the construction of political identity, and in the way narratives have developed over the past centuries in the region. Michael C. Hudson, director of the Center for Contemporary Arab Studies at Georgetown, describes Khalidi as "preeminent in his field". He served as president of the Middle East Studies Association of North America in 1994 and is currently co-editor of the Journal of Palestine Studies with Sherene Seikaly.

Much of Khalidi's scholarly work in the 1990s focused on the historical construction of nationalism in the Arab world. Drawing on the work of theorist Benedict Anderson who described nations as "imagined communities", he does not posit primordial national identities, but argues that these nations have legitimacy and rights. In Palestinian Identity: The Construction of Modern National Consciousness (1997), he places the emergence of Palestinian national identity in the context of Ottoman and British colonialism as well as the early Zionist effort in the Levant. Palestinian Identity won the Middle East Studies Association's top honor, the Albert Hourani Book Award as best book of 1997.

His dating of the emergence of Palestinian nationalism to the early 20th century and his tracing of its contours provide a rejoinder to Israeli nationalist claims that Palestinians had no collective claims prior to the 1948 creation of Israel. His signature work, Palestinian Identity: The Construction of Modern National Consciousness (Columbia University Press, 1997), argues that Arabs living in Palestine began to regard themselves as a distinct people decades before 1948, "and that the struggle against Zionism does not by itself sufficiently explain Palestinian nationalism".

In it, Khalidi also describes the late development, failings and internal divisions within the various elements of the Palestinian nationalist movement.

In Resurrecting Empire: Western Footprints and America's Perilous Path in the Middle East (2004), Khalidi takes readers on a historical tour of Western involvement in the Middle East, and argues that these interactions continue to have a colonialist nature that is both morally unacceptable and likely to backfire. Khalidi's book, Sowing Crisis, places the United States approach to the Middle East in historical context. He is sharply critical of U.S. policies during the Cold War, writing that Cold War policies "formulated to oppose the Soviets, consistently undermined democracy and exacerbated tensions in the Middle East".

Khalidi has written, "It may seem hard to believe today, but for decades the United States was in fact a major patron, indeed in some respects the major patron, of earlier incarnations" of radical, militant Islam, in order to use all possible resources in waging the Cold War. He adds, "The Cold War was over, but its tragic sequels, its toxic debris, and its unexploded mines continued to cause great harm, in ways largely unrecognized in American discourse."

Historian and Israeli Ambassador to the United States Michael Oren has stated that "Khalidi is mainstream" because "the stream itself has changed. The criteria for scholarship have become very political."

Palestinian Identity
Palestinian Identity: The Construction of Modern National Consciousness (1997), is Khalidi's most influential and most widely cited book. In Palestinian Identity, Khalidi demonstrates that a Palestinian national consciousness had it origins near the beginning of the twentieth century. Khalidi describes the Arab population of British Mandatory Palestine as having "overlapping identities", with some or many expressing loyalties to villages, regions, a projected nation of Palestine, an alternative of inclusion in a Greater Syria, an Arab national project, as well as to Islam. Nevertheless, Palestinian Identity was the first to demonstrate substantive Palestinian nationalism in the early Mandatory period. Khalidi writes, "Local patriotism could not yet be described as nation-state nationalism."

Khalidi emphasized in his work that the Palestinian identity had been fundamentally fluid and changing, woven from multiple "narratives" due to individual and family experiences. He described the identity as organically developed due to the challenges of peasants forced from their homes due to Zionist immigrant pressure, but with Palestinian nationalism also being far more complex than merely an anti-Zionist reaction. Praise for his book appeared in the journal Foreign Affairs, with reviewer William B. Quandt viewing the work as "a major contribution to historical understanding of Palestinian nationalism."

Khalidi also documents active opposition by the Arab press to Zionism in the 1880s.

Response to The Iron Cage

Praise
In a review of Khalidi's The Iron Cage: The Story of the Palestinian Struggle for Statehood, for Middle East Policy, Philip Wilcox praised "Khalidi's brilliant inquiry into why Palestinians have failed to win a state of their own" calling the book "a welcome antidote to the propaganda and mythology that still dominate American discussion of the Israeli-Palestinian conflict." Writing in The Guardian, Ian Black said the book "brilliantly analyses the structural handicap which hobbled the Palestinians throughout 30 years of British rule". In a review for Salon, Jonathan Shainin wrote that "The Iron Cage is a patient and eloquent work, ranging over the whole of modern Palestinian history from World War I to the death of Yasser Arafat." In Foreign Affairs, L. Carl Brown wrote that "Khalidi's book is no exercise in victimology. He is tough on the British, the Israelis, and the Americans, but he is scarcely less hard-hitting in appraising the Palestinians". He went on to praise the final chapter's "excellent critique" of the development of the PLO's positions towards Israel and the Two-state solution.

Criticism
New York Times columnist Clyde Haberman said of Khalidi's book The Iron Cage: The Story of the Palestinian Struggle for Statehood: "But he makes this more than an exercise in self-pity by refusing to let the Palestinians themselves off the hook. If they indeed live in an iron cage, well, Khalidi says, they helped mold the bars themselves" and asks "When he talks about repressive Israeli measures having been 'sometimes imposed on the pretext of security,' critics are bound to ask: What pretext? How many suicide bombings of cafes and pizza shops does it take before a country has a right to end them by any method that seems to work?"

Efraim Karsh said about the same book "One would have hoped that after 80 years of stubborn adherence to the 'one-state solution' and an equally adamant rejection of the 'two-state solution,' which have resulted in Palestinian statelessness, all but the most fanatically self-deluded would grasp the root causes of the Palestinian debacle – not least a historian purporting to redress the 'continuing refusal to look honestly at what has happened in this small land over the past century or so.'"

Public life

Khalidi has written dozens of scholarly articles on Middle East history and politics, as well as op-ed pieces in many U.S. newspapers. He has also been a guest on radio and TV shows including All Things Considered, Talk of the Nation, Morning Edition, Worldview, The News Hour with Jim Lehrer, Charlie Rose, and Nightline, and has appeared on the BBC, the CBC, France Inter and the Voice of America. He served as president of the American Committee on Jerusalem, now known as the American Task Force on Palestine, and advised the Palestinian delegation at the Madrid Conference of 1991.

Views on Israeli–Palestinian conflict

Khalidi has written that the establishment of the state of Israel resulted in "the uprooting of the world's oldest and most secure Jewish communities, which had found in the Arab lands a tolerance that, albeit imperfect, was nonexistent in the often genocidal, Jew-hating Christian West." Regarding the proposed two-state solution to the Israel–Palestinian conflict, Khalidi has written that "the now universally applauded two-state solution faces the juggernaut of Israel's actions in the occupied territories over more than forty years, actions that have been expressly designed to make its realization in any meaningful form impossible." However, Khalidi also noted that "there are also flaws in the alternatives, grouped under the rubric of the one-state solution".

He supports the Boycott, Divestment and Sanctions movement.

Regarding American support for Israel, Khalidi stated in an interview, "every other single place on the face of the earth is in support of the Palestinians, yet all of them together aren't a hill of beans compared to the United States and Israel, because the United States and Israel can basically do anything they please. They are the world superpower, they are the regional superpower."

A New York Sun editorial criticized Khalidi for stating that there is a legal right under international law for Palestinians to resist Israeli occupation. For example, in a speech given to the American-Arab Anti-Discrimination Committee, Khalidi said, "[k]illing civilians is a war crime. It's a violation of international law. They are not soldiers. They're civilians, they're unarmed. The ones who are armed, the ones who are soldiers, the ones who are in occupation, that's different. That's resistance." The Sun editorial argued that by failing to distinguish between Palestinian combatants and noncombatants, Khalidi implies that all Palestinians have this right to resist, which it claimed was incorrect under international law. In an interview discussing this editorial, Khalidi objected to this characterization as incorrect and taken out of the context of his statements on international law.

Khalidi has described discussions of Arab restitution for property confiscated from the Jewish refugees from Middle Eastern and North African countries after the creation of Israel as "insidious", "because the advocates of Jewish refugees are not working to get those legitimate assets back but are in fact trying to cancel out the debt of Israel toward Palestinian refugees".

NYC teacher training program 
In 2005 Khalidi's participation in a New York City teacher training program was ended by the city's Schools Chancellor. Chancellor Joel I. Klein issued a statement that "Considering his past statements, Rashid Khalidi should not have been included in a program that provided professional development for Department of Education teachers and he won't be participating in the future." Following the decision, Columbia University president Lee Bollinger spoke out on Khalidi's behalf, writing: "The department's decision to dismiss Professor Khalidi from the program was wrong and violates First Amendment principles... The decision was based solely on his purported political views and was made without any consultation and apparently without any review of the facts."

2008 U.S. presidential campaign

Consequent to publication by the Los Angeles Times of an article about Obama's attendance at a 2003 farewell dinner for Khalidi, their relationship became an issue in the campaign. Some opponents of Barack Obama claimed that the relationship between Obama and Khalidi was evidence that Obama would not maintain a pro-Israel foreign policy if elected. When asked, Obama called his own commitment to Israel "unshakeable" and said he does not consult with Khalidi on foreign policy. Opponents of Republican candidate John McCain pointed out that he had served as chairman of the International Republican Institute (IRI) during the 1990s which provided grants worth $500,000 to the Center for Palestine Research and Studies, which was co-founded by Khalidi, for the purpose of polling the views of the Palestinian people.

WBEZ interview
In a January 2017 interview with public broadcaster WBEZ, Khalidi said pro-Israel people would ‘infest’ the incoming Trump Administration. Khalidi later referred to it as "infelicitous phrasing."

Published works 
 British Policy towards Syria and Palestine, 1906–1914. Ithaca Press for St. Antony's College, 1980.
 Palestine and the Gulf (Co-editor), Institute for Palestine Studies, 1982.
 Under Siege: PLO Decision-making during the 1982 War. Columbia University Press, 1986.
 The Origins of Arab Nationalism (Co-editor), Columbia University Press, 1991.
Palestinian Identity: The Construction of Modern National Consciousness, Columbia University Press, 1997.

 Resurrecting Empire: Western Footprints and America's Perilous Path in the Middle East, Beacon Press, 2004.

 Sowing Crisis: The Cold War and American Dominance in the Middle East, Beacon Press, 2009.
 Brokers of Deceit: How the U.S. Has Undermined Peace in the Middle East, Beacon Press, 2013. 
 The Hundred Years War on Palestine: A History of Settler Colonialism and Resistance, 1917–2017, Metropolitan Books 2020

References

External links
 Columbia University faculty page
 Profile on Rashid Khalidi at the Institute for Middle East Understanding
 Rashid Khalidi on the futility of negotiations, since a one-state solution already exists Haaretz, December 5, 2011
 Video: Rashid Khalidi – Palestine: 40 Years of Occupation, 60 Years of Dispossession (June 23, 2007)
 Review of Rhashid Khalidi's Resurrecting Empire, Western Footprints, and America's Path in the Middle East at Logosjournal.com
 Review of The Iron Cage by Rashid Khalid at the Institute for Middle East Understanding
Interview with the Author of The Iron Cage October 4, 2006 Alternative Radio. Fee charged.

Alumni of St Antony's College, Oxford
Middle Eastern studies in the United States
American foreign policy writers
American male non-fiction writers
21st-century American historians
21st-century American male writers
American Muslims
American writers of Palestinian descent
Columbia University faculty
Columbia School of International and Public Affairs faculty
Historians of the Middle East
Khalidi family
American people of Lebanese descent
University of Chicago faculty
Writers on the Middle East
Yale University alumni
1948 births
Living people
Palestinianists
Academic staff of Lebanese University
United Nations International School alumni
Historians from New York (state)
Palestinologists